The Sicilian Clan is a 1969 French-Italian gangster film based on the novel by Auguste Le Breton. The film was directed by Henri Verneuil and stars Jean Gabin, Lino Ventura and Alain Delon, whose  casting led to the film's box-office success in France. Ennio Morricone composed the score for the picture.

Plot
In Paris, jewel thief Roger Sartet escapes from custody with the help of the Manalese, a small but well-organised Sicilian Mafia clan consisting of the patriarch Vittorio, his two sons and his son-in-law. In prison, Sartet got to know a technician involved in setting up the electronic security at an exhibition centre in Rome, who bit by bit supplied him with details of the system. A priceless collection of jewels will shortly be on show in the centre.

Vittorio and a fellow Mafioso, Tony Nicosia from New York, go to the exhibition, only to find that additional security makes a simple robbery difficult. The jewels will next be on show in New York and Nicosia comes up with a plan to steal the jewels while they are en route. He sends over Jack, an alcoholic ex-pilot, as part of his plan.

Meanwhile in Paris, police Commissaire Le Goff hunts the escaped Sartet, who had earlier killed two of his men in cold blood. The Manalese have put him in a safe house, where he is looked after by Jeanne, the French wife of Vittorio's elder son Aldo, but he breaks cover to go to a hotel with a girl. When Le Goff's men break into the room, Sartet escapes by the window. Guessing that Sartet will need false papers to leave the country, Le Goff's enquiries lead him to the Manalese and their arcade game business, which serves as a cover for their illegal activities. While he questions Vittorio, Sartet slips out of the building under Le Goff's nose.

At a hideout close to the Italian frontier, Jeanne sunbathes nude in front of Sartet and he responds by starting to make love. They are interrupted by Vittorio's six-year-old grandson Roberto, whom Jeanne entreats to tell no-one. Moving to Rome, the gang discreetly kidnap Edward Evans, an English insurance executive sent to oversee the transfer of the jewels to New York, and Sartet takes his place among the officials accompanying the jewels on a regular scheduled flight. Other passengers joining the plane include Jack, Jeanne, Vittorio, and his sons.

At a stopover in Paris, Evans' wife is allowed on board the aircraft to greet her husband, but Vittorio leads her to believe that Evans will be on the same flight the next day. Mrs Evans then rings Rome, to learn that her husband never arrived there, and immediately goes to the police. At police HQ, she identifies Sartet as one of the men she saw on the plane.

Meanwhile, during the descent towards New York, the gang hijack the aircraft. Warned of Sartet's imminent arrival in the United States, the local police race to the airport, but Jack instead lands the plane on a highway that has been closed off by Nicosia's men. They unload the jewels, and the gangsters all split up. Sartet hides out in New York, awaiting his share of the proceeds.

Back at home in Paris, the Manalese family are watching a film in which a couple start to make love. Little Roberto exclaims that it looks just like what Sartet was doing with Jeanne. Though Jeanne denies everything, the others tend to believe the child. They lure Sartet back to Paris with the promise to give him his share. Jeanne calls Sartet's sister, asking her to warn him of the trap, but when she goes to the airport she learns that, mistrusting the Manalese, he had arrived by an earlier flight.

Vittorio agrees to meet Sartet on some waste land, bringing both the money and Jeanne. Once Sartet arrives, he shoots him and the girl dead, leaving the money by the corpses for the police to find. When Vittorio returns home, he is arrested by Le Goff.

Cast
Jean Gabin as Vittorio Manalese
Alain Delon as Roger Sartet
Lino Ventura as Commissaire Le Goff
Irina Demick as Jeanne Manalese
Elisa Cegani as Maria Manalese
Yves Lefebvre as Aldo Manalese
Marc Porel as Sergio Manalese
Philippe Baronnet as Luigi
Karen Blanguernon as Theresa
César Chauveau as Roberto
Amedeo Nazzari as Tony Nicosia
Sydney Chaplin as Jack
Danielle Volle as Monique Sartet
André Pousse as Malik
Edward Meeks as the airline captain
Sally Nesbitt as Mrs. Evans
Christian de Tillière as Jean-Marie Ballard, the electrician
Yves Brainville as the examining magistrate
Bernard Musson as the gendarme during Sartet's transfer

Production

Development
The film was based on a novel, the second in a series of books by Auguste Le Breton who had written Rififi. The first had been filmed by Bernard Borderie as Brigade antigangs (1966).  Film rights to The Sicilian Clan were bought by Henri Verneuil, who teamed with Jacques-Eric Strauss and signed a deal with 20th Century Fox.

Verneuil wrote a screenplay with Pierre Pelegri and then José Giovanni. Verneuil wrote the two lead roles with Jean Gabin and Alain Delon in mind - he had worked with both men before.  As they wrote he decided that the part of the police officer was another strong role and decided to cast Lino Ventura, who had made his film debut in Touchez pas au grisbi (1954) starring Gabin.

Irina Demick was unhappy with the role of her character in the film compared to the novel where she was a lot more active, taking part in the hijacking scene. Verneuil felt the actor would not be believable doing this, but she had considerable influence as she was the then-mistress of the head of Fox, Darryl F. Zanuck. So Verneuil rewrote the scene so that Demick's character takes part in the hijacking as a stewardess.

Shooting
Second unit filming started in New York in March 1969. Dialogue scenes started on March 24 at the "Franstudio" in Saint-Maurice Studios. The film was shot in two versions - French and English.

At the time, Delon was involved in a real-life scandal, the Markovic affair, in which his former bodyguard Stevan Marković had been found murdered.

Release
The film had its premiere in Paris on 8 December 1969.

Reception
In the book French Cinema: From Its Beginnings to the Present, author Rémi Fournier Lanzoni wrote, "This gangster film reinvented the classic gangster genre, elevating it to a higher level with its hard-boiled acting, deep character studies, and attractive photography."

Critical
According to the New York Times the film "has its occasional moments... but mostly it's a tired example of a tired genre." The Los Angeles Times said it "winds up seeming more corny and contrived than witty and ironic."

Box office
In France, the film drew 4,821,585 admissions. It was the third most popular movie of 1969 in France, after Once Upon a Time in the West and The Brain. It was the second-highest grossing film of all-time in France of films not shown on a roadshow release basis, behind La Grande Vadrouille (1966). In the United States and Canada, the film earned  in theatrical rentals during 1970.

According to Fox records, the film required $7,925,000 in rentals to break even and by 11 December 1970 it had earned worldwide rentals of $9,250,000. By September 1970, it had made Fox a profit of $533,000.

References

External links
 
 
 Review of film at Slate Magazine
 Review at filmsdefrance.com
 Story of making of the film at Histoires de Tournages
 The Sicilian Clan at Letterbox DVD

1969 films
1969 crime films
1960s heist films
Adultery in films
French epic films
Films about the American Mafia
Films about the Sicilian Mafia
Films about dysfunctional families
Films based on crime novels
Films based on works by Auguste Le Breton
Films scored by Ennio Morricone
Films directed by Henri Verneuil
Films set in France
Films set in the United States
French crime films
1960s French-language films
French heist films
Police detective films
20th Century Fox films
Films with screenplays by José Giovanni
1960s French films